Samuel Nii Armah Ashitey (born 1 March 2000) is a Ghanaian footballer who plays as a midfielder for USL Championship side Hartford Athletic.

Career

Ghana
Ashitey made his debut in 2016 for Still Believe F.C. and eventually reached the Ghanaian Premier League in 2018 with Crystal Palace FC. During the 2019 season, he signed with Dreams FC, and was loaned out to Berekum Chelsea, where he took part in the 2019 U-20 Viareggio Cup. He had a stellar tournament, playing all five games in Breekum Chelsea's run to the quarterfinals. He earned man of the match honors twice in games against Brazil's Atletico Paranaense and Seria A team Spezia Calcio. Ashitey returned to Dreams FC and played in 8 games during the 2020 season before it was cancelled due to the Covid-19 pandemic.

Hartford Athletic
On 6 January 2021, Ashitey signed with USL Championship side Hartford Athletic. He made his debut on 30 April 2021, starting in a 3–2 win over New York Red Bulls II and was subsequently named to the USL Championship Team of the Week.

References

External links
 
 Nii Armah Ashitey bio

2000 births
Living people
Association football midfielders
Ghanaian footballers
Ghanaian expatriate footballers
Ghanaian expatriate sportspeople in the United States
Expatriate soccer players in the United States
Hartford Athletic players
Ghana Premier League players
USL Championship players